Andrei Sergeyevich Konchalovsky  (born 20 August 1937) is a Russian filmmaker. He has worked in Soviet, Hollywood, and contemporary Russian cinema. He is a laureate of the Order "For Merit to the Fatherland", a National Order of the Legion of Honour, an Officer of the Order of Arts and Letters, a Cavalier of the Order of Merit of the Italian Republic and a People's Artist of the RSFSR. He is the son of writer Sergey Mikhalkov, and the brother of filmmaker Nikita Mikhalkov.

Konchalovsky's work has encompassed theatrical motion pictures, telefilms, documentaries, and stage productions. His film credits include Uncle Vanya (1970), Siberiade (1979), Maria's Lovers  (1984), Runaway Train (1985), Tango & Cash (1989), House of Fools (2002), The Postman's White Nights (2014), Paradise (2016), and Dear Comrades! (2020). He also directed the 1997 miniseries adaptation of the ancient Greek narrative The Odyssey. Earlier in his career, he was a collaborator of Andrei Tarkovsky. His films have won numerous accolades, including the Cannes Grand Prix Spécial du Jury, a FIPRESCI Award, two Silver Lions, three Golden Eagle Awards, and a Primetime Emmy Award.

Early life and education
Konchalovsky was born Andrei Sergeyevich Mikhalkov in Moscow, Russian Soviet Federative Socialist Republic, to an aristocratic family of Mikhalkovs, with centuries-old artistic and aristocratic heritage tracing their roots to the Grand Duchy of Lithuania (in 2009 he testified that a great-grandfather resided in Lithuania). His father was writer Sergey Mikhalkov, and his mother was poet Natalia Konchalovskaya. His brother is filmmaker Nikita Mikhalkov. He is frequently referred to as Andron, but as he stated several times, Andron was just a diminutive used by his grandfather and never was his official name; he prefers the name Andrei.

He studied for ten years at the Moscow Conservatory, preparing for a pianist's career. In 1960, however, he met Andrei Tarkovsky and co-scripted his movie Andrei Rublev (1966).

Career

His first full-length feature, The First Teacher (1964), was favourably received in the Soviet Union and screened by numerous film festivals abroad. His second film, Asya Klyachina's Story (1967), was suppressed by Soviet authorities. When issued twenty years later, it was acclaimed as his masterpiece. Thereupon, Konchalovsky filmed adaptations of Ivan Turgenev's A Nest of Gentle Folk (1969) and Chekhov's Uncle Vanya (1970), with Innokenty Smoktunovsky in the title role.

In 1979 he was a member of the jury at the 11th Moscow International Film Festival. His epic Siberiade upon its 1979 release was favourably received at Cannes and made possible his move to the United States in 1980.

His most popular Hollywood releases are Maria's Lovers (1984), Runaway Train (1985), based on a script by Japanese director Akira Kurosawa (who had written it as an adaptation of Dostoevsky's "House of the Dead"), and Tango & Cash (1989), starring Sylvester Stallone and Kurt Russell. In the 1990s, Konchalovsky returned to Russia, although he occasionally produced historical films for U.S. television, such as his adaption of The Odyssey (1997) and the award-winning remake, The Lion in Winter (2003).

Konchalovsky's full-length feature, House of Fools (2003), with a cameo role by Bryan Adams as himself, set in a Chechen psychiatric asylum during the war, won him a Silver Lion at the Venice Film Festival.

In 2010, Konchalovsky released a longtime passion project of his, The Nutcracker in 3D, a musical adaptation of Peter Ilyich Tchaikovsky's ballet. A musical film, it mixed live action and 3D animation, and starred Elle Fanning, John Turturro, Nathan Lane, and Richard E. Grant. The film was scored with music from the ballet, with additional lyrics by Tim Rice.

In the same year, Konchalovsky also featured in Hitler in Hollywood, a bio-doc about Micheline Presle which evolves into a thrilling investigation of the long hidden truth behind European cinema. This mockumentary thriller uncovers Hollywood's unsuspected plot against the European motion picture industry. The film won the FIPRESCI Prize at the Karlovy Vary International Film Festival and was nominated for a Crystal Globe award in July 2010.

In 2012, Konchalovsky wrote, directed and produced The Battle for Ukraine, which provided an in depth analysis of how Ukraine to this day struggles to escape from the close embrace of its former big brother, Russia. This extensive study lasted for almost three years and involved an array of Ukrainian, Russian and American historians, politicians and journalists, as well as the ex-President of Poland Aleksander Kwasniewski, the ex-President of Slovakia Rudolf Schuster, the ex-President of Georgia Eduard Shevardnadze, the seventh Secretary-General of the United Nations Kofi Annan, the ex-Prime Minister of Russia Viktor Chernomyrdin, and the businessman Boris Berezovsky.

2013 saw Konchalovsky co-produce a story previously untold on film. Film-maker Margy Kinmonth invited Charles III, at the time the Prince of Wales, to make a journey through history to celebrate the artistic gene in his family and reveal an extraordinary treasure trove of work by royal hands past and present, many of whom were accomplished artists. Set against the spectacular landscapes of the Royal Estates and containing insights into works by members of The Royal Family down the centuries and The Prince of Wales's own watercolours, 'Royal Paintbox' explores a colourful palette of intimate family memory and observation.

His film The Postman's White Nights won the Silver Lion at the 71st Venice International Film Festival. The script is centered around the true story of Aleksey Tryaptisyn, a real life postman based in a remote Russian village surrounding the Kenozero lake.

In 2016, Paradise directed by him won the Silver Lion at the 73rd Venice International Film Festival. It was selected as the Russian entry for the Best International Feature Film at the 89th Academy Awards.

In 2020, Konchalovsky directed Dear Comrades!, a historical drama about the Novocherkassk massacre. The film won the Special Jury Prize at the 77th Venice International Film Festival. Anthony Lane, writing for The New Yorker, called the film Konchalovsky's "masterpiece."

Political views
In 2012, Konchalovsky was one of 103 public figures to sign a petition in support of the band Pussy Riot during their 2012 trial.

Konchalovsky endorsed Sergey Sobyanin during the 2013 Moscow mayoral election.

Personal life
Konchalovsky has been married five times. His first wife was Irina Kandat. His second wife was Russian actress Natalya Arinbasarova, with whom he has one son: Egor, born 15 January 1966. His third wife was Viviane Godet, with whom he has a daughter, Alexandra Mikhalkova, born 6 October 1971. His fourth wife was Irina Ivanova, with whom he has two daughters: Nathalia and Elena. His fifth wife is Russian actress Julia Vysotskaya; they have been married since 1998 and have two children: Maria (1999) and Petr (2003).

In October 2013, Konchalovsky and daughter Maria were involved in a vehicular collision in the south of France. Konchalovsky lost control of a rented Mercedes and swerved into oncoming traffic, where he crashed into another car. Maria suffered a traumatic brain injury and was placed into an induced coma. By 2018, Maria's condition had improved, and she returned to Russia with her parents.

Honours 

 2018 Cavalier of the Order of Merit of the Italian Republic (Italy)
 2018 Russian Ludvic Nobel award (Russia)
 2017 Award of the Government of the Russian Federation in Culture for his theater work (Russia)
 2017 The Bridge Award by the Bernhard Wicki Foundation (Germany)
 2017 The title of Professor of Moscow State University (Russia)
 2017 'Person of the Year' award by Federation Of Jewish Communities in Russia (Russia)
 2017 The Federico Fellini Prize 'For a special contribution to the development of the cinema' (Italy)
 2017 The European Medal of Tolerance (ECTR), 'For his cultural achievements focused on preserving the tragic memory of the past including his film 'Paradise' (Brussels)
 2016 'Baltic Star International Award' for Developing and Consolidating Humanitarian Relations in Countries of the Baltic Region (Russia)
 2016 Rivista del Cinematografo Award, Vatican (Italy)
 2016 The Robert Bresson Prize, Vatican (Italy)
 2015 The Moscow Times Awards 'Person of the Year' (Russia)
 2012 Award 'For Contribution to Enlightenment', Kazan International Festival of Muslim Films (Russia)
 2012 International Award of Chingiz Aitmatov, 'For Studio adaptation of a novel' for the movie 'The First Teacher', 1965,
 2011 National Order of the Legion of Honour (Ordre national de la Légion d'honneur) (France)
 2011 The title of Honorary Doctor of the University (National University of Theatre Arts and Cinema (UNATC)
 2011 Honorary award 'Doctor Honorius Causa' for the contribution to cinema (Romania)
 2011 Award 'For the contribution to cinema', International Film Festival of Andrei Tarkovsky 'Zerkalo' (Russia)
 2010 Honorary Award to outstanding citizen of the city of Tuscany (Italy)
 2010 Commemorative Medal '150th anniversary of Anton Chekhov', award 'For the contribution to the theatrical art' (Russia)
 2008 'Gold Star' special award for the contribution to development of the world cinema (Marrakech International Film Festival, Morocco)
 2006 Russian Film Directors Guild Award for citizenship, integrity and contribution to cinema (Russia)
 2005 Officer of the Order of Arts and Letters (France)
 2003 Order 'Danaker' (Republic of Kyrgyzstan)
 2002 The title of 'Honorary Professor of Cinematography' for outstanding contribution to the art, culture and cinema, VGIK (Russia)
 2002 Academician of the National Academy of Motion Picture Arts and Sciences (Russia)
 1997 Special Silver St. George for his contribution to world cinema, 20th Moscow International Film Festival (Russia), 1997
 1997 Order "For Merit to the Fatherland" 4th class (Russia)
 1997 Medal 'In Commemoration of the 850th Anniversary of Moscow' (Russia)
 1980 People's Artist of the RSFSR (USSR)
 1974 Honored Artist of the RSFSR (USSR)
 1972 State Prize of the Kazakh SSR (USSR)

Filmography

Film

Television

Stage credits

Plays
 Eugene Onegin. A play performed at La Scala, Italy, in 1985.
 The Queen of Spades. A play performed at La Scala, Italy, in 1990.
 Miss Julie. A play performed at the Malaya Bronnaya Theatre, Moscow, in 2005.
 King Lear. A play performed at Na Woli, Warsaw, in 2006.
 The Seagull. A play performed at the Odeon Theatre, Paris, in 1987, and at the Mossovet Theatre, Moscow, in 2004. Toured Italy in 2007.
 Uncle Vanya. A play performed at the Mossovet Theatre, Moscow, since 2009. Toured Italy in 2009, the Baltics in 2009 and Israel in 2010.
 Three Sisters. A play performed at the Mossovet Theatre, Moscow, since 2012. 
 La Bisbetica Domata. A play performed at the San Ferdinando Theater, Naples, 2013.
 Edip di Colone. A play performed at Teatro Olimpico, Vicenza, 2014.
 The Cherry Orchard. A play performed at the Mossovet Theatre, Moscow, since 2016. 
 Edip di Colone. A play performed at the Tovstonogov Bolshoi Drama Theater, Saint-Petersburg, since 2017.

Operas
War and Peace. An opera staged at the Mariinsky Theatre, St. Petersburg, in 2000, and at the Metropolitan Opera, New York, in 2002 and 2009.
Un ballo in maschera. An opera staged at the Teatro Regio, Italy, in 2001, and at the Mariinsky Theatre, St. Petersburg, in 2001.
Boris Godunov. An opera staged at the Teatro Regio, Turin, Italy, in 2010.
Our Ancient Capital. A musical event held to commemorate Moscow's 850th anniversary on Red Square in 1997.
Celebrating 300 Years of St. Petersburg  A show held in St. Petersburg, in 2003.

Awards and nominations

BAFTA Awards

César Awards

Emmy Awards

Golden Eagle Awards

Nika Awards

Film festivals

References

External links

1937 births
Soviet emigrants to the United States
Soviet film directors
Gerasimov Institute of Cinematography alumni
German-language film directors
Academic staff of High Courses for Scriptwriters and Film Directors
Russian screenwriters
Male screenwriters
People's Artists of the RSFSR
Russian male writers
Recipients of the Nika Award
Living people
Action film directors
Primetime Emmy Award winners
Venice Best Director Silver Lion winners
Members of the Civic Chamber of the Russian Federation
Academicians of the National Academy of Motion Picture Arts and Sciences of Russia
Recipients of the Order "For Merit to the Fatherland", 4th class
Recipients of the Vasilyev Brothers State Prize of the RSFSR
Mikhalkov family